Pauley may refer to:

Pauley, Kentucky, an unincorporated community in the United States

People with the surname
Aaron Pauley (born 1988), American musician
Art Pauley (1905–1984), American historian and author
Cecil De Pauley (1893–1968), Church of Ireland bishop and author
David Pauley (born 1983), American baseball player
Edwin W. Pauley (1903–1981), American oilman and political appointee
Jane Pauley (born 1950), American television journalist
Laura Pauley, American mechanical engineer
Mieka Pauley (born 1980), American singer-songwriter and guitarist
Patricia Pauley (born 1941), British former figure skater
Phil Pauley (born 1975), British designer and futurist
Robert Pauley (1923–2009), American radio broadcasting executive
William H. Pauley III (1952–2021), United States federal judge

People with the given name
Pauley Perrette (born 1969), American actress, known for playing Abby Sciuto on NCIS

See also
Pauley Pavilion, arena in Los Angeles, California, on the campus of UCLA
Pauly (disambiguation)
Pawley (disambiguation)